The Earthquake Engineering Research Institute (EERI) is a leading technical society in dissemination of earthquake risk and earthquake engineering research both in the U.S. and globally.  EERI members include researchers, geologists, geotechnical engineers, educators, government officials, and building code regulators.  Their mission, as stated in their 5-year plan published in 2006, has three points: "Advancing the science and practice of earthquake engineering; Improving understanding of the impact of earthquakes on the physical, social, economic, political, and cultural environment; and Advocating comprehensive and realistic measures for reducing the harmful effects of earthquakes".

Goals
In the 2006 5-year plan, the EERI has identified four main goals towards fulfilling their mission and planned strategies to carry them out.

"Enhance and expand educational materials and technical programs."  They will hold two seminars per year on topics intended to interest a wide audience.  They will also post many of their publications online, such as their journal Earthquake Spectra.  
 "Outreach and Advocacy"  They will continue to release their findings on earthquake risks, including the costs of potential disasters.  They hope to influence policymakers to increase funds for preventing these risks.  They hope also to include earthquake safety into the "green" building design movement.
"Maintain a strong program of international activities."  They serve as an inflow point in the U.S. for earthquake research from other countries.  They also serve as an outflow, translating their research into languages other than English.
"Expand and broaden financial resource base."  They wish to raise $1 million in donations by 2010, and increase worldwide membership to 3,000.  They wish to expand their programs and partnerships with other organizations with more workshops and seminars.  In February, 2010, the EERI entered a partnership with the Geo-Institute of American Society of Civil Engineers, increasing their collaboration to reduce earthquake hazards.

History
The EERI was formed in 1948 as an advising committee on the U.S. Coast and Geodetic Survey.   It quickly became its own independent, nonprofit organization, with the purpose of studying why buildings fail under earthquake disasters, and what methods can prevent these failures.    At first they conducted their research in laboratories of different University or Government groups.  As the EERI grew, they began to more often send research funds to the Universities, and have the University conduct the research.  EERI focused more on identifying and investigating areas in need of research, and policymaking based on the university's lab results.

In 1952 the EERI organized the first Conference on Earthquake Engineering, at UCLA.  In 1955, they held the first World Conference on Earthquake Engineering.    In 1984, the 8th World Conference was held in San Francisco.  This conference brought in scientists from 54 countries.

At first, membership to the EERI was limited to invite-only engineers and scientists.   
In 1973, they began to hire members by application, and increased their membership from 126 to 721 by 1978.  In 1991, EERI began receiving funding from the Federal Emergency Management Agency (FEMA), to continue publishing information on how to reduce damage from earthquakes.

After a number of location changes, the EERI headquarters settled in Oakland, California.

Their quarterly journal, Earthquake Spectra, covers current research on earthquake engineering and is available online or by subscription.   Its target audience is any geologist, seismologist, or related engineer.  EERI also publishes many other types of information, including a monthly newsletter, an oral history series, and field investigation reports.

California earthquake assessments
EERI performs risk assessments on earthquake potential sites around the world.  This is a quick summary of two reports on California cities.

In 2006 an engineering firm related to the EERI has projected over $122 billion in damages, if a repeat of the 1906 San Francisco earthquake occurs.  This number includes damages to homes and structures, excluding fire damage.  The EERI lobbies for government funding to prevent natural disasters.  The money is best spent before loss of life and large-scale structural damage, though often it is not seen until afterward, as evidenced by Hurricane Katrina.  The EERI and the USGS have identified that a potential large earthquake in Los Angeles would cause more damage than Katrina at New Orleans, with up to $250 billion in total damages and 18,000 deaths.

Student involvement
EERI has a student chapter in 29 colleges across the U.S. to further promote interest in earthquake engineering. A few representatives from each chapter make up the Student Leadership Council (SLC).  Since 2008 the EERI and SLC have held the Undergraduate Seismic Design Competition, which was previously run by the Pacific Earthquake Engineering Research Center (PEER).  In this competition a team of undergraduate college students must design and construct a structure made of balsa wood.  The structure is limited by many rules, such as a weight limit, the individual heights of each floor, total height limit, and more.  The structure is subjected to extra weight and placed on a shake table, which moves to simulate an earthquake.  An accelerometer is placed on top of the building to measure how fast the top of the building shakes.  Students’ structures are judged on a number of criteria, including the height of the structure, number of floors, the accelerometer readings, and whether the structure breaks.  Students will want to make a building close to the height limit because the higher floors are worth more points. The 8th annual competition is to be held in Portland, OR, March 7 through 10, along with the 63rd EERI annual meeting.

References

External links
EERI's Website
EERI Student Leadership Council's Website
Earthquake Spectra's Website

Engineering research institutes
Earthquake engineering